Arrernte or Aranda or sometimes referred to as Upper Arrernte (Upper Aranda), is a dialect cluster in the Arandic language group spoken  in parts of the Northern Territory, Australia, by the Arrernte people. Other spelling variations are Arunta or Arrarnta, and all of the dialects have multiple other names.

There are about 1,800 speakers of Eastern/Central Arrernte, making this dialect one of the widest spoken of any Indigenous language in Australia, the one usually referred to as Arrernte and the one described in detail below. It is spoken in the Alice Springs area and taught in schools and universities, heard in media and used in local government.

The second biggest dialect in the group is Alyawarre. Some of the other dialects are spoken by very few people, leading to efforts to revive their usage; others are now completely extinct.

Arrernte/Aranda dialects

"Aranda" is a simplified, Australian English approximation of the traditional pronunciation of the name of Arrernte .

Glottolog defines the Arandic group of languages/dialects as comprising 5 Aranda (Arrernte) dialects, plus two distinct languages, Kaytetye  (Koch, 2004) and Lower Southern (or just Lower) Aranda, an extinct language. Ethnologue defines 8 Arandic languages and classifies them slightly differently.

Two dialects are more widely spoken than any of the others:
 Eastern Arrernte (also known as Central Arrernte) dialects include Akarre, Antekerrepenh, Ikngerripenhe, Mparntwe Arrernte. Spoken in the Alice Springs area and others, there were 1,910 speakers in the 2016 census, making it the most widely spoken Arrernte, and Australian Aboriginal, language. This is the dialect most often referred to as "Arrernte" and the strongest of all in the group. There is a project encouraging its use, Apmere angkentye-kenhe,
 Alyawarra dialect is spoken by the Alyawarra people, in the Sandover and Tennant Creek areas as well as Queensland. In 2016 there were 1,550 speakers of the language, giving it a status of "Developing". It is similar to Western Arrernte. (Kaytetye is related to this dialect, but is classed as a separate language.)

All of the other dialects are either threatened or extinct:
 Andegerebinha (or Antekerrepenhe or Ayerrerenge) was spoken in the Hay River area (east of Alice Springs), but is now extinct.
 Ayerrerenge, (also known as Yuruwinga, Bularnu and other variations) was spoken by the Yuruwinga/Yaroinga people is the north-easternmost member of the Arrernte group of languages, and the least studied.  It was spoken across the Queensland border in the Headingly, Urandangi, Lake Nash, Barkly Downs and Mount Isa areas, and near Mount Hogarth, Bathurst,  and 
Argadargada in the NT. It is now extinct. Breen (2001) says that the language was regarded as the same or similar to Andegerebinha/Antekerrepenhe by some speakers, and Glottolog regards it as a dialect of it.

 Anmatyerr (also spelt Anmatyerre and other variations), divided into Eastern and Western, is spoken by the Anmatyerr (or Anmatjirra) people. The Eastern form seems more closely related to Eastern Arrernte and Southern Alywarre than Western Anmatyerre, which is noticeably different phonetically from other Arandic languages. it is spoken in the Mount Allan and northwest Alice Springs regions. With only 640 speakers in the 2016 census, it is regarded as threatened.
 Western Arrarnta (Western Arrernte, Western Aranda,  Akara, Southern Aranda, possible sub-dialect Akerre), spoken west of Alice Springs, is nearly extinct, being only spoken by 440 people in 2016. Other terms are Tyuretye Arrernte and Arrernte Alturlerenj. Breen distinguishes Tyurretye Arrernte (which he initially called Mbunghara) from Western Arrernte, saying that two speakers first recorded, from the Standley Chasm and Mbunghara, was not known until the mid-1980s, and that it may have been the "real" Western Arrernte, before the latter was mixed with Southern Arrernte (Pertame) at the Hermannsburg Mission. Anna Kenny has noted that the people of the Upper Finke River prefer their language to be known as Western Aranda. This dialect has similarities with Alyawarre and Kaytetye.

Sign language
The Arrernte also have a highly developed sign language, also known as  Iltyeme-iltyeme.

Current usage and tuition
The Northern Territory Department of Education has a program for teaching Indigenous culture and languages, underpinned by a plan entitled Keeping Indigenous Languages and Cultures Strong – A Plan for Teaching and Learning of Indigenous Languages and Cultures in the Northern Territory with the second stage of the plan running from 2018 to 2020).

The Alice Springs Language Centre delivers language teaching at primary, middle and senior schools, offering Arrernte, Indonesian, Japanese, Spanish and Chinese.

There are two courses teaching Arrernte at tertiary level: at the Batchelor Institute and at Charles Darwin University.

There are books available in Arandic languages in the Living Archive of Aboriginal Languages.

Projects are being run to revive dying dialects of the language, such as Southern Arrernte/Pertame.

Eastern/Central Arrernte

Phonology
This description relates to Central or Eastern Arrernte.

Consonants

Stops are unaspirated. Prenasalized stops are voiced throughout; prestopped nasals are voiceless during the stop. These sounds arose as normal consonant clusters; Ladefoged states that they now occur initially, where consonant clusters are otherwise forbidden, due to historical loss of initial vowels; however, it has also been argued that such words start with a phonemic schwa, which may not be pronounced (see below).

Vowels

All dialects have at least .

Two-vowel systems are very rare worldwide, but are also found in some Northwest Caucasian languages. It seems that the vowel system derives from an earlier one with more phonemes, but after the development of labialised consonants in the vicinity of round vowels, the vowels lost their roundedness/backness distinction, merging into just two phonemes. There is no allophonic variation in different consonantal contexts for the vowels. Instead, the phonemes can be realised by various different articulations in free variation. For example, the phoneme  can be pronounced  in any context.

Phonotactics
The underlying syllable structure of Eastern/Central Arrernte is argued to be VC(C), with obligatory codas and no onsets. It is also common for phrases to carry a final  corresponding to no underlying segment.

Among the evidence for this analysis is that some suffixes have suppletive variants for monosyllabic and bisyllabic bases. Stems that appear monosyllabic and begin with a consonant in fact select the bisyllabic variant. Stress falls on the first nucleus preceded by a consonant, which by this analysis can be stated more uniformly as the second underlying syllable.
And the frequentative is formed by reduplicating the final VC syllable of the verb stem; it does not include the final .

Orthography
Central/Eastern Arrernte orthography does not write word-initial , and adds an e to the end of every word.

Grammar

Eastern and Central Arrernte has fairly free word order but tends towards SOV. It is generally ergative, but is accusative in its pronouns. Pronouns may be marked for duality and skin group.

Pronouns

Pronouns decline with a nominative rather than ergative alignment:

Body parts normally require non-possessive pronouns (inalienable possession), though younger speakers may use possessives in this case too (e.g.  or  'my head').

Examples

Cultural references
Peter Sculthorpe's music theatre work Rites of Passage (1972–1973) is written partly in Arrernte and partly in Latin.
Western and Southern Arrernte were used in parts of the libretto for Andrew Schultz' and Gordon Williams' Journey to Horseshoe Bend, based on the novel by Ted Strehlow.

Notes

References

Sources

Further reading

Arrernte: Data collected on the Arrernte language (Sorosoro program for linguistic diversity, 2015)
Arrernte (Arrernte angkentye) (Omniglot.com)
Arrernte language - with map. (Aboriginal Art and Culture, Alice Springs)
Gavan Breen Eastern Arrernte collection - written materials (PARADISEC open-access collection)
 

Keeping The Aboriginal Language Strong (The Spoken Word)
Published, rare items and special materials on Arrernte language and people: bibliographies of items held in the AIATSIS library

Arandic languages
Alice Springs
Arrernte
Indigenous Australian languages in the Northern Territory
Endangered indigenous Australian languages in the Northern Territory
Vertical vowel systems